Pseudodromia is a genus of crabs in the family Dromiidae, often referred to as sponge crabs. They are small or medium-sized crabs which get their name from the ability to shape a living sponge into a portable shelter for themselves. A sponge crab cuts out a fragment from a sponge and trims it to its own shape using its claws. The last two pairs of legs are shorter than other legs and bend upward over the crab's carapace, to hold the sponge in place. The sponge grows along with the crab, providing a consistent shelter.

Species
The genus contains the following species:
Pseudodromia cacuminis Kensley, 1980
Pseudodromia latens Stimpson, 1858
Pseudodromia rotunda (MacLeay, 1838)
Pseudodromia trepida Kensley, 1978

References

Dromiacea